The Minnesota Fringe Festival is a performing arts festival held annually at various venues throughout Minneapolis, Minnesota. The tradition of fringe festivals began with the establishment of the Edinburgh Festival Fringe in 1947, and starting in 1991, producers began to establish festivals of their own in the United States. The first Minnesota Fringe Festival took place in 1994, with 53 shows presented at six venues across Minneapolis's Cedar-Riverside neighborhood. Although early iterations of the festival included film screenings and visual art exhibitions, the festival later narrowed its focus to performing arts in five categories: comedy, dance, drama, musical, and "something different". During its first four iterations, the festival took place in late June and early July. Since 1998, it has taken place during late July and early August, consistently running for 11 days annually since 2005, when it expanded from a 10-day run.

The festival grew from its inception in 1994, in terms of the number of shows presented, venues occupied, and tickets purchased, to become the largest unjuried fringe festival in the United States, a distinction it held until 2018 when it was overtaken by the Orlando International Fringe Theater Festival and the Washington, D.C., Capital Fringe Festival. In 2010, over 50,000 tickets were sold for the first time, and in 2015, more performances took place (909) and tickets were sold (50,338) than in any other year. The most shows (177) were presented in 2013, and two years, 2004 and 2015, tied for the most venues utilized by the festival, with 24 apiece. This value includes traditional theaters as well as site-specific venues, which can vary from year to year and have included a loading dock, a bedroom, a bathroom, and a moving car.

The 2020 iteration was initially canceled on account of the COVID-19 pandemic before being retooled as an entirely virtual festival. Both live and in-person performances were presented for the 2021 festival, though unlike in previous years, the Minnesota Fringe did not staff in-person venues. The most recent instance of the festival ran run August 4–14, 2022.

Festivals

Notes

References

External links

Theatre-related lists
Fringe festivals in the United States
Fringe Festivals
Fringe Festivals